Kurgan is the largest city and the administrative center of Kurgan Oblast in the south of the Urals Federal District of Russia. Population: .

Until 1782 Kurgan bore the name Tsaryovo Gorodishche.

History

An urban settlement was established here between 1659 and 1662 as Tsaryovo Gorodishche (meaning Imperial Citadel) by Timofey Nevezhin, a farmer from Tyumen. In the ensuing years it was developed as a fortress town. It served as a frontier post and its fortified position enabled it to defend other Russian settlements from nomad attacks. Nevertheless, it was itself not always able to withstand such attacks, and was sometimes plundered and burnt down.

The city was granted city privileges by the Empress Catherine the Great in 1782, which is when it acquired its present name and became the seat of an uyezd. The present name is taken from a large kurgan (burial mound) close to the original settlement.

Its coat of arms was granted on 17 March 1785, and it became the administrative center of Kurgan Oblast in 1943. Kurgan was awarded the Order of the Red Banner of Labour in 1982.

Administrative and municipal status
Kurgan is the administrative center of the oblast. Within the framework of administrative divisions, it is incorporated as Kurgan City Under Oblast Jurisdiction—an administrative unit with the status equal to that of the districts. As a municipal division, Kurgan City Under Oblast Jurisdiction is incorporated as Kurgan Urban Okrug.

Economy and military
Kurgan stands on the Trans-Siberian Railway line, between Yekaterinburg and Omsk. It is served by two railway stations and the Kurgan Airport, and it was home to the Kurgan West air base during the Cold War. It is also home to Russian Ilizarov Scientific Center for Restorative Traumatology and Orthopaedics, KAvZ autobus plant, and the machine building company Kurganmashzavod which produces the widely known BMP-1, BMP-2 and BMP-3 infantry fighting vehicles.

Climate
Kurgan has a humid continental climate (Köppen climate classification Dfb). Influenced by the Siberian High, it is a relatively dry climate. Winters are cold, although not severe by Siberian standards. Summers are variable but relatively moderate, even though heat waves can bring temperatures well above the  average July highs.

Educational facilities
Agricultural academy
Kurgan State University
Kurgan International University
Military Academy
Railroad Academy
Various theaters
Academy of Labor and Social Relations

Gallery

Notable people

Oleg Bogomolov (born 1950), governor of Kurgan Oblast
Dmitri Bushmanov (born 1978), association football player
Maxim Fadeev (born 1968), singer-songwriter, composer and producer
Yuri Galtsev (born 1961), Honored Artist of the Russian Federation
Gavriil Ilizarov (1921–1992), physician, known for inventing the Ilizarov apparatus for lengthening limb bones
Vyacheslav Kamoltsev (born 1971), association football player
Larisa Korobeynikova (born 1987), fencer
Evgeni Krasilnikov (1965–2014), volleyball player
Leonid Krasin (1870–1926), politician and diplomat
Ivan Kurpishev (born 1969), powerlifter
Dmitri Loskov (born 1974), association football player
Aleksey Markovsky (born 1957), swimmer
Aleksandr Menshchikov (born 1973), wrestler
Yana Romanova (born 1983), biathlete
Sergei Rublevsky (born 1974), chess grandmaster
Yulia Savicheva (born 1987), singer
Alexander Solonik (1960–1997), Russian mobster and hitman
Elena Temnikova (born 1985), singer
Sergei Teryayev (born 1994), professional ice hockey defenceman
Alexander Vinogradov (1930–2011), journalist and writer
Sergey Vinogradov (1958–2010), journalist, translator, and writer
Sergei Yakovlev (1925–1996), actor
Mikhail Znamensky (1833–1892), writer, memoirist, painter, caricaturist, archeologist and ethnographer

International relations

Twin towns and sister cities
Kurgan is twinned with:
 Appleton, United States
 Rufina, Italy

References

Notes

Sources

External links

Official website of Kurgan 
Kurgan news portal 
Cultural heritage of Kurgan 

 
1662 establishments in Russia
Populated places established in 1662
Kurgansky Uyezd
Recipients of the Order of the Red Banner of Labour